Roger Sherman Baldwin Foster (April 21, 1857 – February 22, 1924) was an American lawyer. He was instrumental in getting the charges against the Homestead Strike participants dropped.

Early life and education
Foster was born in Worcester, Massachusetts. He was the son of Dwight Foster and Henrietta Perkins Baldwin, daughter of Connecticut Governor and US Senator Roger Sherman Baldwin, and the great-great grandson of Roger Sherman.

He attended Boston Latin School and the University of Marburg (1873-1874). In 1878, he graduated from Yale University, where he was a member of Skull and Bones, Psi Upsilon Fraternity, and Linonia.

In 1880, having studied law in the office of Henry E. Davies and at Columbia, he received his LL.B. from Columbia Law School, and was admitted to the bar. In 1883 he earned his M.A. from Yale.

Career
He began the practice of law in New York City in 1880. In 1888, he lectured at Yale on Federal Jurisprudence. He was appointed by Governor Flower to the Tenement House Commission in 1894.

He was the author of numerous legal pamphlets and treatises.  An article he wrote for Albany Law Journal giving his opinion that there was no precedent for treason charges against Homestead Strike participants was instrumental in getting those charges dropped.

Foster died on February 22, 1924, and was buried in Kensico Cemetery.

Family life
Foster was married to Laura Pugh Moxley on 22 February 1921 in Plainfield, New Jersey. They had one daughter, Laura Alice.

References

Further reading
"Roger Sherman Baldwin Foster." Dictionary of American Biography. New York: Charles Scribner's Sons, 1936. Gale Biography In Context. Web. 30 Mar. 2011.

Massachusetts lawyers
American legal writers
Boston Latin School alumni
University of Marburg alumni
Yale University alumni
Columbia Law School alumni
1857 births
1924 deaths
Writers from Worcester, Massachusetts
New York (state) lawyers
19th-century American lawyers
Burials at Kensico Cemetery
Psi Upsilon